The 2018 Thai FA Cup is the 25th season of a Thailand's knockout football competition. It was sponsored by Chang, and known as the Chang FA Cup for sponsorship purposes. The tournament is organized by the Football Association of Thailand. 92 clubs were accepted into the tournament, and it began with the qualification round on 4 April 2018, and concluded with the final on 27 October 2018. The winner would have qualified for the 2019 AFC Champions League preliminary round 2 and the 2019 Thailand Champions Cup.

Calendar

Results
Note: T1: Clubs from Thai League 1; T2: Clubs from Thai League 2; T3: Clubs from Thai League 3; T4: Clubs from Thai League 4; T5: Clubs from Thailand Amateur League.

Qualification round
The qualification round will be featured by fifty-six clubs; including eight clubs from T2, eight clubs from T3, nineteen clubs from T4, and twenty-one clubs from T5. Qualification round had drawn on 21 March 2018 by FA Thailand.

First round
The first round will be featured by sixty-four clubs; including twenty-eight clubs which were the winners of the qualification round (eight clubs from T2, three clubs from T3, nine clubs from T4, and eight clubs from T5) and thirty-six clubs that the new entries (eighteen clubs from T1, five clubs from T2, three clubs from T3, three clubs from T4, 
and seven clubs from T5). First round had drawn on 30 May 2018 by FA Thailand.

Second round
The second round will be featured by thirty-two clubs which were the winners of the first round; including thirteen clubs from T1, eight clubs from T2, five clubs from T3, five clubs from T4, and one club from T5. Second round had drawn on 30 June 2018 by FA Thailand.

Third round
The third round will be featured by sixteen clubs which were the winners of the second round; including eight clubs from T1, four clubs from T2, one club from T3, and three clubs from T4. Third round had drawn on 13 July 2018 by FA Thailand.

Quarter-finals
The quarter-finals round will be featured by eight clubs which were the winners of the third round; including five clubs from T1, two clubs from T2, and one club from T3. Quarter-finals round had drawn on 26 July 2018 by FA Thailand.

Semi-finals
The semi-finals round will be featured by four clubs which were the winners of the quarter-finals round; including three clubs from T1 and one club from T2. Semi-finals round had drawn on 23 August 2018 by FA Thailand.

Final

The final round will be featured by two clubs which were the winners of the semi-finals round; both are the clubs from T1. It was played at the Supachalasai Stadium in Bangkok, Thailand on 27 October 2018.

See also
 2018 Thai League
 2018 Thai League 2
 2018 Thai League 3
 2018 Thai League 4
 2018 Thailand Amateur League
 2018 Thai League Cup
 2018 Thailand Champions Cup

References

 http://www.thaileague.co.th/official/?r=Tournament/FaCup&iSeason=3
 http://www.smmsport.com/reader.php?news=212960
 http://www.smmsport.com/reader.php?news=213700
 http://www.thailandsusu.com/webboard/index.php?topic=390727.0
 https://www.facebook.com/pg/facupthailand/photos/?tab=album&album_id=1836940689683624
 http://www.smmsport.com/reader.php?news=216791
 http://www.smmsport.com/reader.php?news=219194
 https://www.facebook.com/facupthailand/photos/a.1158332340877799.1073741827.1158325950878438/1962746257103066/?type=3

External links
Official Facebook page

2018 in Thai football cups
Thailand FA Cup
Thailand FA Cup
Thai FA Cup seasons